Sananda Francesco Maitreya (born Terence Trent Howard; March 15, 1962), who started his career with the stage name Terence Trent D'Arby, is an American singer and songwriter who came to fame with his debut studio album, Introducing the Hardline According to Terence Trent D'Arby (1987). The album included the singles "If You Let Me Stay", "Sign Your Name", "Dance Little Sister",  and the number one hit "Wishing Well".

Early life 
Terence Trent D'Arby was born Terence Trent Howard in Manhattan in 1962. His mother is Frances Howard, a gospel singer, teacher and counselor. Frances Howard married Bishop James Benjamin Darby, who became his stepfather and raised him. He took this stepfather's last name and later added the apostrophe.

He trained as a boxer in Orlando and in 1980 won the Florida Golden Gloves lightweight championship. He received an offer to attend boxing school in the United States Army, but went to college instead. After enrolling at the University of Central Florida, he quit a year later and enlisted in the U.S. Army. He was posted at Fort Sill, Oklahoma, and then served in the 3rd Armored Division, near Frankfurt, West Germany. He was formally court-martialed and dishonorably discharged by the army in April 1983 after going absent without leave.  While in West Germany, he  worked as a band leader with the band The Touch, releasing an album of material called Love on Time (1984). It was later re-issued in 1989 as Early Works after his worldwide success as a solo artist. In 1986, he left West Germany for London, where he briefly played with The Bojangles, who were his backing group on his 1988 tour. In London, he signed a recording contract with CBS Records.

Fame as Terence Trent D'Arby 
D'Arby's debut solo album, Introducing the Hardline According to Terence Trent D'Arby, was released in July 1987. The album produced hits including "If You Let Me Stay", "Sign Your Name", "Dance Little Sister", and the number one hit "Wishing Well".

In an interview, D'Arby expressed a high opinion of his first album, claiming that it was the most important album since the Beatles' Sgt. Pepper. After the comments leaked to US media outlets, he stated that most of what he said was exaggerated, but that it is sometimes necessary to "hit people over the head" to get their attention. The album earned him a Grammy Award in the category Best R&B Vocal Performance, Male (1989) and a BRIT Award for International Breakthrough Act, and he also received Grammy and Soul Train nominations for Best New Artist.

D'Arby's follow-up album, Neither Fish nor Flesh (1989), was very different from his debut, and producer Martyn Ware stated in a 2021 interview that the album was ahead of its time. It took four more years and a move to Los Angeles until his next album, Symphony or Damn (1993), was released. The record contained the singles "Delicate" and "She Kissed Me". It peaked at No. 4 on the UK Albums Chart. In 1995, D'Arby released Vibrator, which was followed by a world tour.

D'Arby's music has been included on several movie and television soundtracks. He sang the theme song of 1991's Frankie and Johnny. "Right Thing, Wrong Way" featured prominently in the end credits of Beverly Hills Cop III. "What Shall I Do?" was featured in an episode of the UPN television series Girlfriends. He sang the ending song, "Letting Go", in the 1996 film The Fan. D'Arby's songs were also used in Prêt-à-Porter and the 1995 miniseries The Promised Land.

In 1999, D'Arby collaborated with INXS to replace his friend, the late vocalist Michael Hutchence, so the band could play at the official opening of Stadium Australia (a major venue for the Sydney Olympics).

Later career as Sananda Maitreya

D'Arby legally changed his name to Sananda Maitreya on October 4, 2001, explaining "Terence Trent D'Arby was dead... he watched his suffering as he died a noble death. After intense pain I meditated for a new spirit, a new will, a new identity". Maitreya has said that his name change resulted from a series of dreams he had in 1995. Though the name does not have any religious significance, Maitreya explained that he understood it to mean "rebirth" in Sanskrit.  means 'possessed of happiness', and  means 'friendly, kind, loving, benevolent.

From 2001 to 2021, Maitreya released nine studio albums and four live albums.

2001 also marked the release of the Wildcard album. Initially downloadable for free from the artist's official website, the album received great support from international critics in particular for its single, the song "O Divina". At the beginning of 2002, Maitreya moved to Milan for love, where he married Italian Architect and TV presenter Francesca Francone in 2003, and began his sixth project, Angels & Vampires - Volume I. The artist initially chose to publish the project on the official website in chapters, as the recordings continued and then released it on June 29, 2005, in Mp3 format.

In July 2005, Maitreya began the second volume of the project: Angels & Vampires - Volume II, successfully continued the division into chapters. On 29 April 2006, the second mastered volume is published. The Angels & Vampires album contains 40 songs, including a cover of "Angie", a tribute to the Rolling Stones. The genre of the album is Post Millennium Rock. Maitreya played all the instruments during the recordings and entirely produced, wrote, and arranged the entire project by himself.

In 2007, three of his songs were played in Judd Apatow's movie Knocked Up.

After the 2007 European tour, new concerts followed in 2008, and television participation in the 2008 Christmas concert. In addition to the studio albums, Maitreya has released four live albums from 2007 to 2012: Influenza in Firenze, Camels At The Crossroads, Lovers & Fighters, and Confessions of a Zooathaholic; a selection of the best songs from live concerts and tours performed in the same year.

Maitreya released Nigor Mortis in 2008, which followed the same evolutionary process as Angels & Vampires. The album was first published in chapters during the recordings, and then came out in the mastered version at the end of 2008 and is available on CD and MP3 at the link of his website. The Sphinx album was released in March 2011; in the same month the instrumental version of The Sphinx and the new live album by the artist related to the 2010 concerts of the Post Millennium Rock: Confessions of a Zooathaholic has been released.

In March 2013, Return to Zooathalon was released, followed in 2015 by the double album The Rise of the Zugebrian Time Lords. 2017 marked the release of a monumental work: Prometheus & Pandora, 53 songs divided into three volumes, the artist declared that this album has become so important and impressive because through music he has elaborated the mourning for the loss of his great friends and idols, David Bowie, Prince, George Michael, and Tom Petty.

In December 2020, a new live album, Some Sake in Osaka, was released,  it showcases a Japan tour with his historic American band.

On 15 March 2021, Maitreya released his 12th studio album, Pandora's PlayHouse, which included three collaborations, the song "Reflecting Light", composed with the Australian duo The Avalanches; "Time Is On My Side" with Irene Grandi and the opening song of the project: "Pandora's Plight" with jazz pianist Antonio Faraò. The project has an instrumental song called "Prince", which honors the memory and the friendship of Maitreya and Prince.

In 2022, he was featured on Calvin Harris' new Love Regenerator track "Lonely" (a record which Harris recorded with Italian producer Riva Starr), with the vocals coming from 1989's "…And I Need to Be with Someone Tonight".

Film career
Maitreya has appeared in two films and in the TV mini-series Shake, Rattle and Roll: An American Love Story, in which he played the part of Jackie Wilson.

Personal life

Maitreya has a daughter from a previous relationship, London-based musician Seraphina Simone, born in December 1988.

In the late 1980s, Maitreya had a year-long affair with television presenter and writer Paula Yates, who was married to Bob Geldof.

Maitreya married Italian television host and architect Francesca Francone in 2003. They have two sons.

Discography

as Terence Trent D'Arby
Introducing the Hardline According to Terence Trent D'Arby (1987)
Neither Fish nor Flesh (1989)
Symphony or Damn (1993)
Vibrator (1995)

as Terence Trent D'Arby/Sananda Maitreya
Wildcard (2001)

as Sananda Maitreya
Angels & Vampires – Volume I (2005)
Angels & Vampires – Volume II (2006)
Nigor Mortis (2009)
The Sphinx (2011)
Return to Zooathalon (2013)
The Rise of the Zugebrian Time Lords (2015)
Prometheus & Pandora (2017)
Pandora's Playhouse (2021)

Filmography
as Terence Trent D'Arby
1984: Schulmädchen '84 (feature film directed by Nikolai Müllerschön)
1993: Heimat II: A Chronicle of a Generation (TV series, 1 episode, "Kennedys Kinder") 
1999: Shake, Rattle and Roll: An American Love Story as Jackie Wilson (TV mini-series)
1999: Clubland as Toby (feature film directed by Mary Lambert)
2000: Static Shock (TV series, 1 episode, "They're Playing My Song" as DJ Rock)

See also
 1989 BRIT Awards
 31st Annual Grammy Awards
 List of artists who reached number one in the United States
 List of UK Albums Chart number ones of the 1980s

Notes

References

External links
 
 YouTube Official Page

 
1962 births
Living people
African-American  male singer-songwriters
African-American rock musicians
African-American rock singers
American people of Scotch-Irish descent
American expatriates in Germany
American expatriates in Italy
American expatriates in England
American multi-instrumentalists
American male pop singers
American contemporary R&B singers
American rock singers
American rock songwriters
American soul singers
People from Manhattan
People from DeLand, Florida
University of Central Florida alumni
Brit Award winners
Grammy Award winners
20th-century African-American male  singers
21st-century African-American male singers
Singer-songwriters from New York (state)
Singer-songwriters from Florida